Pure Lake Provincial Park is a provincial park in British Columbia, Canada.

References

External links

Provincial parks of British Columbia
Geography of Haida Gwaii
North Coast Regional District
1981 establishments in British Columbia
Protected areas established in 1981